Petteri Similä (born April 9, 1990) is a Finnish former professional ice hockey goaltender who played a solitary games in the Liiga for the KalPa. He was selected by the Montreal Canadiens in the 7th round (211th overall) of the 2009 NHL Entry Draft. 

On December 12, 2010, Simila played 25.1 minutes of a game in the SM-liiga with KalPa.

Career statistics

International

References

External links

1990 births
Living people
Barrie Colts players
Finnish ice hockey goaltenders
KalPa players
Mikkelin Jukurit players
Montreal Canadiens draft picks
Niagara IceDogs players
Sportspeople from Oulu
SaPKo players
TuTo players